Romeu Oliveira Ribeiro (born 13 January 1989) is a Portuguese professional footballer who plays as a defensive midfielder for Dumiense CJPII Futebol SAD.

Club career
Born in Vieira do Minho, Braga District, Ribeiro began his youth career with local S.C. Braga, being acquired by S.L. Benfica in 2004. Like Miguel Vítor, he first played with the main squad due to injuries to teammates, making his debut in the Primeira Liga and European competition in exactly the same matches that Vítor, in August 2007.

However, in January 2008, both players were loaned to second division side C.D. Aves. In August, the loan period was extended until June of the following year.

In July 2009, Ribeiro would be once again loaned, joining C.D. Trofense as it had just been relegated back to the second tier. In the following year, in the same situation, he signed for top-flight club C.S. Marítimo.

Ribeiro moved to Marítimo on a permanent basis in the summer of 2011, after his contract with Benfica expired. However, as manager Pedro Martins – and all his predecessors – preferred foreign players, especially Brazilians, he spent the vast majority of his three-year spell in Madeira with the reserves, in divisions three and two.

After being released on 30 June 2013, Ribeiro spent the vast majority of his career in the second division, the exception to this being the 2014–15 season in the main tier, with F.C. Penafiel (1,153 minutes of action, team relegation).

Personal life
Ribeiro's father was a goalkeeper, whilst his younger brother Yuri also played for Benfica and Portugal at youth level.

Club statistics

References

External links

1989 births
Living people
People from Vieira do Minho
Sportspeople from Braga District
Portuguese footballers
Association football midfielders
Primeira Liga players
Liga Portugal 2 players
Segunda Divisão players
S.L. Benfica footballers
C.D. Aves players
C.D. Trofense players
C.S. Marítimo players
F.C. Penafiel players
Académico de Viseu F.C. players
Casa Pia A.C. players
Portugal youth international footballers
Portugal under-21 international footballers